Interstate 295 (I-295), also known as the Fayetteville Outer Loop, is a partially completed Interstate-grade planned  bypass around the western side of Fayetteville, North Carolina, United States. The final section between US 401 and I-95 near Parkton is being constructed in segments and is expected to be completed around 2026. A  segment from Parkton Road northeast of Parkton to Black Bridge Road south of Hope Mills and is signed as North Carolina Highway 295 (NC 295). NC 295 was also used as temporary designations for the highway before I-295 was signed.

Route description
The open  segment of NC 295 begins in Robeson County between Parkton and Hope Mills. A diamond interchange with roundabouts at Parkton Road, exit 2, is the southern terminus of the interim southern segment. NC 295 heads northwest, crossing into Cumberland County. Passing over the South End Subdivision and Brisson Road on a bridge, the highway then curves to the north before ending at Black Bridge Road, exit 4, at an interchange of a similar layout to exit 2.

I-295 begins at US 401 (Raeford Road), running north to the All-American Freeway, then running east to Bragg Boulevard, where it is then part of a  concurrency with NC 24 and NC 87 until Murchison Road. Heading further east, it connects with US 401 again at Ramsey Street, before crossing the Cape Fear River and connecting with River Road before ending at its northern terminus at I-95/US 13, near Eastover. Exit numbers along the route match NC 295 milemarkers added in 2014 when previous signage designating the route Future I-295 were removed and replaced with NC 295 signs, both along the loop itself and at the loop's interchange with I-95.

Dedicated and memorial names
I-295 has two dedicated stretches of freeway.

 The Airborne and Special Operations Highway: Official North Carolina name of I-295 from I-95 to Raeford Road. Approved in July 2014 and dedicated on August 16, 2014, at the Airborne & Special Operations Museum.
Lyndo Tippett Highway: Official North Carolina name of I-295 from I-95 to Ramsey Street. Approved May 2019 and dedicated on October 10, 2019.

History
The future designation of the Fayetteville Outer Loop as I-295 was approved by the American Association of State Highway and Transportation Officials (AASHTO) in May 2005 following an earlier approval by the Federal Highway Administration (FHWA). Signs designation "Future I-295" were put up along the route when the section between I-95 and River Road was opened in July 2005. The first short section of this highway had opened earlier in June 2003, and it extended only from River Road to US 401. Then, the only mentions of a highway number were on street signs at the entrance ramps that said I-295 (with an additional "FUTURE" on some). In May 2019, the FHWA officially added the then open  of NC 295 to the Interstate System, this follows up on approval by AASHTO late 2018. The North Carolina Department of Transportation (NCDOT) may have received a waiver since two parts of it (namely the bridge that crosses the Cape Fear River and its interchange with I-95) are not quite up to Interstate Highway standards.

Construction on the next section of I-295, located from US 401 to the All American Freeway, was scheduled to start in the later months of 2008, and then probably completed by early 2012, but this construction project was put on hold in November 2008 due to the severe shortage of money for highway construction in North Carolina at that time and extending though 2011. Instead of constructing this segment as one contract, work was split up into three smaller segments. Work first started in 2009 on the section from Bragg Boulevard (NC 24) to Murchison Road (NC 210) using federal stimulus monies. This was completed in 2014. In March 2011, a contract to construct the portion of the loop between US 401 and Murchison Road was awarded to a construction company; however, this did not include final paving. The contract for paving was issued in 2014 and is scheduled to be completed during mid-2016, delayed from April 2014.

On August 4, 2014, a  new section of the Fayetteville Outer Loop opened between Murchison Road and Bragg Boulevard. Considered critical in relieving congestion around Fort Bragg, this section traverses eastbound along collector–distributor lanes between the two exits, while westbound uses an actual stretch of the freeway.  Signage along this stretch reflected a rerouting of NC 24/NC 87. On August 11, 2016, a  new section opened between Murchison Road and Ramsey Street, connecting the two existing segments of the Fayetteville Outer Loop together. Another segment continuing the Loop to All American Freeway was opened on December 2, 2016.

The remainder of the route from All American Freeway south to I-95 near Parkton is to be completed in segments, with construction starting between 2018 and 2020 with the loop not scheduled to be totally complete until around 2025. Governor Pat McCrory announced in December 2015 that the remaining segments would now be funded under changes to the state's method of apportioning transportation funds. These changes were approved by the NCDOT Board in January 2016. On November 25, 2019, a  segment opened between the All American Freeway and Cliffdale Road. On August 19, 2020, a  segment between Cliffdale Road and US 401 (Raeford Road) was opened to traffic. On November 21, 2022, a  orphaned segment between Parkton Road and Black Bridge Road signed as NC 295 opened to traffic.

Route number changes

The Fayetteville Outer Loop has had a variety of actual and proposed highway designations over the years. Its first proposed Interstate designation, rejected by AASHTO in 2003, was I-195. Other earlier designations have included extensions of US 13 (in some newspaper articles) or as NC 24. It was signed as Future I-295 from 2005 to 2014, which also appeared on state maps from 2006 to 2012.

On July 23, 2011, NCDOT designated the Fayetteville Outer Loop as NC 295. The circumstances for the rule change cited was necessary for public safety and welfare. This marks its official establishment, six years after the first section of the new freeway was completed. On January 15, 2019, the FHWA approved the I-295 designation between All American Freeway and I-95/US 13 after NCDOT completed two design changes that were acceptable. Effective that same day, NC 295 was decommissioned in favor of I-295.

On April 21, 2020, NC 295 was reestablished in an encore designation between Cliffdale Road (Secondary Road 1400 [SR 1400]) and All American Expressway (SR 1007). The reason for its reintroduction is that Interstate designations must end at a National Highway System route. Lasting only a few months, it officially changed over to I-295 on August 17, 2020, upon connection to US 401 (Raeford Road).

The  orphaned segment of highway opened on November 21, 2022, is signed as NC 295 per signage at the Parkton Road interchange.

Exit list

See also 

 U.S. Roads portal

References

External links

 
 I-295 on Kurumi.com
 Fayetteville Outer Loop
 NCRoads.com: I-295
 NCRoads.com: N.C. 295

95-2
2 North Carolina
Transportation in Fayetteville, North Carolina
Transportation in Robeson County, North Carolina
Transportation in Cumberland County, North Carolina